Tracey Takes On... features Tracey Ullman playing an array of original characters. Unlike her previous shows where characters were very rarely repeated, Ullman came up with a recurring cast of nineteen characters to play over the course of the show's four-season run (plus six one-offs). Six of these characters originated from her previous specials: Trevor Ayliss, Virginia Bugge, and Janie and Jackie Pillsworth from Tracey Ullman: A Class Act, and Linda Granger and Fern Rosenthal from Tracey Ullman Takes on New York. Janie is the only character to appear in both specials and all four seasons of the show.

Two characters were retired during the show's run: Virginia after season 2, and Mrs. Noh Nang Ning after season 3. Conversely, two characters were added partway through the show: Sheneesha Turner in season 3, and Madam Nadja in season 4.

Three actors portrayed Virginia's husband, Timmy: Michael Palin in (Tracey Ullman: A Class Act), Hugh Laurie (season 1), and Tim McInnerny (season 2). Likewise, two actors played Fern's husband, Harry: Michael Tucker (Tracey Ullman Takes on New York; seasons 1, 3–4), and George Segal (season 2).

Overview

Main characters
All are played by Tracey Ullman.

Recurring minor characters

Trevor Ayliss
Age 43. British. Trevor is a gay airline steward based out of London, Heathrow. Trevor grew up in Northern England, and now lives in Osterley with his partner, Barrington "Barry" LeTissier (Michael McKean), an antiquarian bookseller. Trevor fathered a child with a fellow stewardess ("Family"). He is a big fan of Linda Granger.

Virginia Bugge
Age 36. British. Virginia Bugge (pronounced 'byoog') was born in Rhodesia and is married to The Right Honourable Timothy "Timmy" Bugge, the Conservative MP for Greater Diddlebury and the Minister of Fishing and Game. They have two children, Tasmin and Piers, who have attended boarding school since the age of six. Virginia is even more ambitious than her husband, once convincing him to attempt suicide to preserve her reputation following a political scandal ("Death"). She did not appear after season 2.

Chic
Chic (pronounced 'chick' or 'cheek') is a male New York City cab driver of indeterminate Middle Eastern descent and a self-described "chick-magnet" (hence his name). Chic came to the United States illegally with his sister. He made his way around New York City knowing only two English phrases: "Are you talking to me?" and "Show me your tits!". He sold drugs in the 1970s to get his hack license ("1976"). He has a brother, Piki, who runs a falafel stand and a cousin, Momo, who owns a discount carpet warehouse ("Money").

Chic claims to have had many celebrities in his cab, and even claims to have taught John Travolta his moves for the movie Saturday Night Fever ("1976"). Chic runs "the only two-star cab cafe in Manhattan" ("Food"). He was the bronze medal winner at the Pan Mediterranean song Festival with his band Teiku, for their song "Slide Down My Olive Tree (Ooh, Baby, La La La)."

Chic's real name is an ongoing gag in the show. His license identifies him as Chic with only the first three letters (A-v-a) of his surname visible due to a sticker that says "Hot Sex" covering the rest. In the episode "Money", Chic is audited by an IRS agent who tries to pronounce his last name: "Okay, Mr. Abbab... Avvan?"

Kay Clark

Age 42. Kay is a spinster originally from England. She moved to the United States with her invalid mother to take advantage of the health benefits. She works at a bank, Van Nuys Savings and Loan.

Hope Finch
Age 19. Hope is an idealistic college student. She attends Sweetbriar College, where she resides in Margaret Sanger Hall. She's a virgin, and although not currently a lesbian, she's "young and impressionable."

Rayleen Gibson
Age 34 (approximated by the wear on her back molars). Rayleen is an Australian "stuntwoman to the stars". When she was a child, she was lost on a family camping trip and until the age of ten was raised by dingos ("Childhood"). She eventually met up with a woman (Olivia Newton-John) who saw to her education and put her in touch with film producers. She went on to marry Mitch Gibson (Danny Woodburn), a little person ("Romance"). Rayleen and Mitch own and run Aged-Animal-Actors-Home (or A.A.A.H.), for retired animal actors. Mitch was killed during a freak accident on the set of The Lost World: Jurassic Park. At his funeral, Rayleen learns that Mitch had been married previously and never bothered to divorce his former wife, thus making her and Mitch's marriage legally invalid ("Loss").

Birdie Godsen
Age 42. Birdie is a right-wing devout Christian fundamentalist homemaker. Her husband Robert is a tobacco industry executive. Birdie homeschools their seven children to prevent them from being exposed to multicultural programs and teaches them subjects that will be useful to them in their daily lives: reading, writing, arithmetic, religion, marksmanship and taxidermy. The family lives on Dan Quayle Drive in a 'graceful gated community' in Atlanta, Georgia. Birdie is aunt to Chris Warner. She has a twin brother, Sandy, who runs a homosexual deprogramming center, Straight Ways ("Religion"). In her spare time, Birdie sells Militia M'Lady products, attends a "We Hate Hillary" club ("Politics"), and looks out for black government helicopters flying overhead, with weaponry in her backyard to shoot them down if need be.

Linda Granger
Age varies. Linda is an actress, singer, dancer and author. Linda starred as Vickie Starr in the hit 1970s television series VIP Lounge. She has a tell-all autobiography, I'm Still Here!! My Lifelong Battle with Alcoholism, Disease, and Personal Misfortune, which details her battles with drugs, alcoholism, cancer, and eating disorders. Linda is also a recovering sex addict. She has one child, a daughter named Marmalade, who she secretly gave up for adoption (to sustain her public image) and then later re-adopted. Marmalade's father is unknown ("Secrets"). Her manager Candy Casino (Seymour Cassel) helps run her life. She often remarks, "I have a strong homosexual fanbase."

Her Royal Highness
Age 57. HRH derives enormous pleasure from making everyone around her as uncomfortable as possible. Her private secretary, Captain Philip "Pip" St. Aubyn (Alastair Duncan) is always on hand to assist her.

Sydney Kross
Age unknown ("It's illegal to ask that question"). A ruthless and charmless high-profile Beverly Hills attorney. Her motto is "You name it, I'll sue it." She despises most music and plays, but is an ardent Riverdance fan ("Culture").

Erin McColl
Age 47. Erin is the former lead singer of the 1970s band Wisechild, with whom she had a falling out because she no longer wanted to tour to stay near her L.A. pharmacist ("Music"). Erin is often stupid and depends on her manager Dusty (Mo Gaffney) for guidance. In her first episode, "Nostalgia", her manager was instead a Dusty Springfield lookalike named Rusty (Kate McGregor-Stewart).

Madam Nadja
Age 60. Nadja is originally from Romania and is now a Hollywood madam who conducts all her business from her bed. She was great friends with Nicolae and Elena Ceaușescu, and was at one time his mistress. Her parrot Vlad talks to her.

Mrs. Noh Nang Ning
Age 70. Mrs. Noh Nang Ning, who is of indeterminate Asian origin, owns and operates a Los Angeles doughnut shop, Yankee Doodle Donuts. She is a hard-working and patriotic American, and almost always relates things to doughnuts. Mrs. Ning grew up as an orphan in her homeland. She was eventually engaged to a prince, but the wedding was interrupted when a revolution broke out. Mrs. Ning escaped to the United States, smuggling in with her fiancé posing as her uncle ("Childhood"). She works long hours and finds little time for pleasantries (playing Pai gow in Las Vegas). However, she does make time to sponsor her granddaughter Kim in ice skating competitions ("Family"). She does not appear in season 4.

Janie Pillsworth
Age 37. Manhattan magazine editor. Janie, born Janine, hails from Broxbourne, England and is the only child to Frank and Jackie Pillsworth. She attended a prestigious British boarding school thanks to her working class father who sacrificed his kidney to pay her tuition. While there, Janie reinvented herself and disowned her parents. The family wasn't reunited until an unscrupulous colleague revealed Janie's true identity and she was forced to face her past. After her father died, Janie let her mother, who also acts as a live-in nanny.

Ruby Romaine

Age 72. A Hollywood makeup artist (one of the oldest still working in the union) who's seen it all; she worked heavily during Hollywood's heyday. Ruby drinks and smokes heavily. She takes care of her shell-shocked Vietnam war veteran son Buddy, along with her cat Duke and their Vietnamese Pot-bellied, Oinky. Ruby has one daughter, Desirée.

Fern Rosenthal
Age 56. Fern is a Jewish homemaker, originally from Long Island. After thirty-seven years of marriage, Fern convinced her husband Harry to retire to Boca Raton, Florida after he suffered a heart attack. Harry was the owner of a chain of seventeen discount pharmacies. They have one daughter, Sheila and a grandson, Ryan. Fern's closest friend (and sometimes rival) is condo board president Jobie Wolff (Julie Kavner). Harry was thought to have been eaten by an alligator on a golf course ("Loss"), but Fern soon discovered that he had been having an affair with their maid and the two had run off together and were living in Belize. Fern tracked Harry down and an altercation broke out resulting in Harry being eaten alive by a shark ("Agents").

Sheneesha Turner
Age 34. Sheneesha is an African American airport security guard. She works the metal detector, along with her friends and co-workers, Hellura (Adele Givens) and Ida (Patricia Belcher). Sheneesha has given birth to seven children despite years of standing next to the airport's X-ray machine. She has severe blood pressure issues that require medication. She is enthusiastic about searching passengers and their luggage for forbidden items.

Chris Warner
Age 32. Chris, a lesbian, originally from Barstow, Texas, is the girlfriend of professional golfer Midge Dexter (Julie Kavner) and niece to Birdie Godsen and Birdie's twin brother, Sandy, a Christian fundamentalist preacher who runs a homosexual deprogramming center, Straight Ways. Chris put her career as a step aerobics instructor on hold to travel the country with Midge. The pair made headlines when they jointly came out by publicly embracing after Midge's first win ("Romance").

One-off characters

Anya
Appeared in "Tracey Takes On... Nostalgia"

A Russian babushka who longs for the old days of the Cold War.

Laura Demerol
Appeared in "Tracey Takes On... Nostalgia"

An actress who takes part in a documentary about The Epic That Never Was.

Alicia del Mar
Appeared in "Tracey Takes On... Nostalgia"

An actress who went into seclusion after a film, which would come to be known as The Epic That Never Was, shut down production. Only Ruby Romaine knows her whereabouts.

Sydney's mother
Appeared in "Tracey Takes On... Fantasy"

Sydney fantasizes about framing her with information she has about her murdering her father. Sydney sued for custody of her bosom when she refused to breastfeed her.

Sandy
Appeared in "Tracey Takes On... Religion"

Birdie Godsen's twin brother (also uncle to Chris Warner). A Christian fundamentalist preacher who runs a homosexual deprogramming center, Straight Ways.

Marigold
Appeared in "Tracey Takes On... Obsession"

Trevor and Barry's ballroom dance instructor.

References

Sources

 
 
 

Tracey Ullman